Klaus Wallas (born 31 March 1953) is an Austrian judoka. He competed in the men's heavyweight event at the 1976 Summer Olympics.

References

1953 births
Living people
Austrian male judoka
Olympic judoka of Austria
Judoka at the 1976 Summer Olympics
Sportspeople from Salzburg
20th-century Austrian people